The Syriac Catholic Archeparchy of Mosul (or informally Mossul of the Syriacs) is a Syriac Catholic Church ecclesiastical territory or archeparchy in northern Iraq. It is not a metropolitan see and is immediately exempt to the Syriac Catholic Patriarch of Antioch and the Roman Congregation for the Oriental Churches, and not part of any ecclesiastical province. Its cathedral is the Syriac Catholic Cathedral in the episcopal see of Mosul.

History 
The Archeparchy of Mosul was established in 1790 from territory with no previous Syriac Catholic ordinary or territory.

Statistics 
, it pastorally served 45,000 Catholic in 15 parishes and 2 missions with 82 priests (56 diocesan, 26 religious), 1 deacon, 36 lay religious (33 brothers, 3 sisters) and 15 seminarians.

Episcopal ordinaries
Archeparchs (Archbishops) of Mosul 

 Cyrille Behnam Benni (1862 – 1893.10.12), later Eparch of Mardin and Amida of the Syrians (Turkey) (1893.10.12 – 1897.09.13), Patriarch of Antioch of the Syrians (Lebanon) ([1893.10.12] 1894.05.18 – death 1897.09.13)
 Grégoire Pierre Habra (born Syria) (1901.08.16 – 1924.03.24), later Metropolitan Archbishop of Damascus of the Syrians (Syria) (1924.03.24 – death 1933.03.21)
 Atanasio Giorgio (Cyrille) Dallal (1926.07.31 – death 1951.12.14), previously Archeparch of Baghdad of the Syrians (Iraq) (1912.09.04 – 1926.07.31)
 Jules Georges Kandela (1952.03.07 – 1959.08.23), previously Titular Bishop of Cephas ([1951.04.26] 1951.08.15 – 1952.03.07); later Auxiliary Eparch of the patriarchate Antioch of the Syrians (Lebanon) (1959.08.23 – 1971) & Titular Archbishop of Seleucia Pieria (1959.08.23 – death 1980.04.15)
 Cyrille Emmanuel Benni (1959.10.23 – death 1999.12.09)
 Basile Georges Casmoussa (1999.09.22 – 2011.03.01), later Bishop of Curia of the Syrians (2011.03.01 – ...), Apostolic Visitor in Western Europe of the Syrians (2014.01.13 – 2017.06.21), Apostolic Visitor in Australia of the Syrians (2017.06.21 – ...)
 Boutros Moshe  (2011.03.01 – ...), no previous prelature.

See also 
 List of Catholic dioceses in Iraq

References

Sources and external links 
 GCatholic, with Google photo - data for all sections

Syriac Catholic dioceses
Eastern Catholicism in Iraq